Carr Lane railway station, also known as Carr Lane Halt railway station, served the village of Pilling, in Lancashire, England, on the Garstang and Knot-End Railway.

History 
The station opened in July 1921 by the Knott End Railway. It was situated on the west side of the street it was named after, Carr Lane. The only facilities the station had was a short platform that was later extended and a timber waiting room. It was initially served by all of the services but it became a request stop in the 1921–1922 winter timetable. Like the other stations on the line, it struggled when the bus service was introduced, so it closed on 31 March 1930. The tracks were lifted in 1953.

References

External links 

Disused railway stations in the Borough of Wyre
The Fylde
Railway stations in Great Britain opened in 1921
Railway stations in Great Britain closed in 1930
1921 establishments in England
1930 disestablishments in England